Mabel Scott Lauder Pryde (12 February 1871 – July 1918) was a Scottish artist, the wife of artist William Nicholson, and the mother of artists Ben Nicholson and Nancy Nicholson and the architect Christopher 'Kit' Nicholson.

Life 
She was the daughter of David Pryde, headmaster of Edinburgh Ladies College 1870–1891, and Barbara Lauder, whose father William was a brother of the famous Scottish artists Robert Scott Lauder and James Eckford Lauder. Mabel had one brother, the artist James Pryde. As children, they lived at 10 Fettes Row, a north-facing Edinburgh house.

Pryde trained at the Bushey School of Art in Hertfordshire under the tutelage of Hubert von Herkomer. Here she met fellow student William Nicholson, whom she married in 1893. She introduced Nicholson to her brother James and all three moved to the Eight Bells, a former pub in Denham, in Buckinghamshire.

Pryde and Nicholson had four children: Ben (1894–1982); Anthony (1897–1918), killed in action during the First World War; Annie Mary "Nancy" (1899–1978); and Christopher "Kit" (1904–1948). They moved to Rottingdean in 1909. In July 1918, Pryde died from influenza during the 1918 flu pandemic.

Work 
Pryde exhibited under her married name in several group shows in London, culminating in a solo show  at the Chenil Gallery in 1912. Her work is included in the collections of the Tate Museum, London and the National Galleries of Scotland.

References

External links

Photograph of Pryde
Pryde painting of the Harlequin
Pryde painting of her family
Pryde painting of her son, Ben
Pryde painting of her son, Kit

1871 births
1918 deaths
19th-century Scottish painters
20th-century Scottish painters
19th-century Scottish women artists
20th-century Scottish women artists
Artists from Edinburgh
Deaths from Spanish flu
Nicholson arts family
Scottish women painters